Lyara Medeiros (born 19 September 1996) is a Brazilian volleyball player who has represented her country in youth and world championships. She is a member of the Brazil women's national under-23 volleyball team.

She was part of the Brazil national indoor volleyball team at the  2013 FIVB Volleyball Girls' U18 World Championship, 2015 Copa Panamericana, 2016 Women's U22 South American Volleyball Championship, 2015 FIVB Volleyball Women's U20 World Championship, and 2016 Montreux Volley Masters.

Clubs 

 2016 Bradesco

References

External links 

 http://www.fivb.org/vis_web/volley/WU202015/WU202015_p2-064.pdf

Brazilian women's volleyball players
1996 births
Living people
Wing spikers